Arvi Martin Savolainen (born 24 October 1998) is a Finnish Greco-Roman wrestler. He won the silver medal in the 97 kg event at the 2022 European Wrestling Championships held in Budapest, Hungary.

Career 

He won a bronze medal at the 2015 Cadet Wrestling World Championships held in Sarajevo, Bosnia and Herzegovina. He won one of the bronze medals in the men's 67 kg event at the 2018 European U23 Wrestling Championship held in Istanbul, Turkey. In 2019, he won the gold medal in the men's 97 kg event at the World U23 Wrestling Championship in Budapest, Hungary. In 2020, he lost his bronze medal match against Jello Krahmer of Germany in the 130 kg event at the European Wrestling Championships held in Rome, Italy.

In January 2021, he won the gold medal in the 97 kg event at the Grand Prix Zagreb Open held in Zagreb, Croatia. In March 2021, he qualified at the European Qualification Tournament to compete at the 2020 Summer Olympics in Tokyo, Japan. In April 2021, he competed in the 97 kg event at the European Wrestling Championships held in Warsaw, Poland. A few months later, he won one of the bronze medals in his event at the 2021 Wladyslaw Pytlasinski Cup held in Warsaw, Poland.

At the 2020 Summer Olympics, he lost his bronze medal match against Mohammad Hadi Saravi of Iran in the 97 kg event. At the 2021 U23 World Wrestling Championships held in Belgrade, Serbia, he won one of the bronze medals in the 97 kg event.

In 2022, he won the silver medal in his event at the Vehbi Emre & Hamit Kaplan Tournament held in Istanbul, Turkey. He won the silver medal in the 97 kg event at the 2022 European Wrestling Championships held in Budapest, Hungary. A few months later, he won one of the bronze medals in his event at the Matteo Pellicone Ranking Series 2022 held in Rome, Italy.

Achievements

References

External links 

 

1998 births
Living people
Finnish male sport wrestlers
Wrestlers at the 2020 Summer Olympics
Sportspeople from Lahti
Olympic wrestlers of Finland
European Wrestling Championships medalists
21st-century Finnish people